Emily Ge Song or Song Ge (born 1990 or 1991) is a Chinese-American media executive at Creative Artists Agency and a former TV host at China Central Television. In 2018, she was named by Forbes in the "30 under 30" list for Asia.

Biography 
Song Ge was born and raised in Tianjin, China, in 1990 or 1991. As a teenager, she worked as a TV host for China Central Television. When she was in college, she interviewed Warren Buffett and Bill Clinton.

After finishing high school, Song studied Product Design Engineering at Stanford University, where she ran a TV station on campus. After Stanford, Song worked on Broadway musical productions in San Francisco, before receiving an MBA from Harvard Business School.

After graduating from Harvard, Song moved to Los Angeles to assume her current role as an executive at Creative Artists Agency, the world's largest entertainment agency. In her position at CAA, she helps guide China-U.S. investment decisions for investing 150 million dollars towards films, TV, sports, and music. She was named to Forbes Magazine's "30 under 30" list for Asia in 2018.

References 

Year of birth missing (living people)
Living people
1990s births
Businesspeople from Tianjin
Stanford University alumni
Harvard Business School alumni
Chinese television presenters
Chinese women television presenters